Robert Strassburg (August 30, 1915 – October 25, 2003) was a 
leading American conductor, composer, musicologist and music educator of the twentieth century. His studies in music were completed under the supervision of such leading composers as Igor Stravinsky, Walter Piston and Paul Hindemith, with whom he studied at Tanglewood. His formal academic studies were completed at the New England Conservatory of Music and Harvard University, where he obtained a fellowship in composition. He also completed a doctorate in Fine Arts at the University of Judaism in Los Angeles. As a musicologist, Dr. Strassburg is regarded as a leading authority on the compositions of the composer Ernest Bloch.

Biography
Robert Strassburg's contributions to the advancement of music education within the United States of America were far ranging and comprehensive in nature. After serving as a lecturer at Brooklyn College (1947–1950), he obtained a position as artist in residence at the Brandeis Arts Institute in California (1951–1955). During his years in Miami, he founded the All-Miami Youth Symphony in 1958, and was conductor until 1961. Today, it is known as the Greater Miami Youth Symphony 
and is one of the oldest youth symphonies in continuous existence in Florida. Additional contributions were made as the Assistant Dean for the School of Fine Arts at the University of Judaism (now the American Jewish University) in Los Angeles (1961–1966). This culminated in an appointment as professor of Music at the California State University at Los Angeles in 1966.

Strassburg's contributions as a composer were also undertaken during the course of an extended fifty-year period. An early composition titled Lost was completed as early as 1945 and received critical acclaim.

As music director for various synagogues he expressed a keen interest in Jewish liturgical music and completed several sacred compositions. Many secular compositions also emerged during the ensuing years including over thirty musical settings of the poetry of Walt Whitman. In later years, a monumental choral symphony in ten movements was also completed in honor of the poet Walt Whitman titled Leaves of Grass
(1992). He contributed to a variety of film scores as well as incidental music for such theatrical productions as: King Lear, The Rose Tattoo, and Anne of the Thousand Days.

Strassburg is noteworthy as the author of the critically acclaimed biography of Ernest Bloch, Ernest Bloch: Voice in the Wilderness. The research materials associated with this publication along with Dr. Strassburg's written insights are accessible at the Belknap Collection for the Performing Arts. The collection is archived for research purposes at the University of Florida, Gainesville.

Several of Robert Strassburg's pupils emerged in later years as noted musicians and composers including: Yehudi Wyner, Jack Gottlieb, Charles Davidson, Diane Thome and John Serry.

Compositions
 Lost (1945)
 4 Biblical Statements (1946)
 Fantasy and Allegro (1947)
 Torah Sonata (piano, 1950)
 The Heritage of Heaven (string orchestra, 1955)
 Chelm (Opera, 1956)
 Psalm 117 (Choral, 1965)
 Tropal Suite (String Quartet, 1967)
 Terecentenary Suite (Viola & Piano)
 Patriarchs (String Orchestra)
 Migrations of a Melody (Baritone Narrator Chamber Orchestra)
 Festival of Lights Symphony (String Orchestra)
 Leaves of Grass: A Choral Symphony  (Choral symphony, 1992)
 Mah Tavu: High Holiday for Cantor, mixed choir (SATB) with optional keyboard, 1993
 Prayer of Columbus ( for Voice & Piano, 1993)
 Three "Leaves of Grass" - A Walt Whitman Trilogy (Piano, 1996)
 Walt Whitman Cycle (Tenor & Orchestra)
 Congo Square (Opera) 
 Kabbalat Shabbat (Liturgical)
 Mosaic Horizons (Liturgical)

Archives

Audio recordings of several liturgical works composed by Robert Strassburg have been archived within the Milken Archive of Jewish Music.

Musical influences
Strassburg enjoyed close contact with several other composers of his era including:
 Paul Ben-Haim
 Mario Castelnuovo-Tedesco
 Julius Chajes
 Erich Zeisl

References

External links
Robert Strassburg on JSTOR.org
Robert Strassburg at the Milken Archive selected discography.
Robert Strassburg's musical legacy as held in libraries worldwide and listed on WorldCat.org. 
Robert Strassburg at The Juilliard School of Music Libraries
The Robert Straussburg Collection of Ernest Bloch at the Belknap Collection of Performing Arts, University of Florida.
Knowing the Score: The Hidden History of the Greater Miami Youth Symphony by Sharon Katz Higgins

American male classical composers
American classical composers
American classical musicians
American opera composers
Harvard University alumni
New England Conservatory alumni
American male conductors (music)
American Jewish University faculty
Jewish classical musicians
Jewish American classical composers
1915 births
2003 deaths
20th-century American composers
20th-century American conductors (music)
20th-century American male musicians
Brooklyn College faculty
20th-century American Jews
21st-century American Jews